Rollins Creek is a stream in Ray County in the U.S. state of Missouri.

Rollins Creek has the name of the local Rollins family.

See also
List of rivers of Missouri

References

Rivers of Ray County, Missouri
Rivers of Missouri